Fakhruddin G. Ebrahim, TI (Urdu: فخر الدين جى ابراهيم;  February 12, 1928 – January 7, 2020) was a Pakistani judge, a legal expert and senior most lawyer. He was appointed as the 24th Chief Election Commissioner of Pakistan on 14 July 2012 and served until he resigned on 31 July 2013 and oversaw the 2013 election.

Ebrahim was born in 1928 in Ahmedabad, Bombay Presidency, British India. In 1945, he attended the Gujarat Vidyapith where he earned his LLB with distinctions in 1949. While there, Ebrahim studied courses on philosophy and also attended the lectures given by Mohandas Karamchand Gandhi, which played an important role in his advocacy for non-violence. In 1950, Ebrahim moved to Pakistan and attended the Sindh Muslim Law College, where he earned an LLM and was awarded an honorary Juris Doctor in 1960. In 1961, Ebrahim established his own firm while he continued to lecture at the Sindh Law College. In 1971, Zulfikar Ali Bhutto appointed him Attorney General of Pakistan.

He served as the interim Law Minister from 18 July 1993 until 19 October 1993, and interim Justice Minister from 5 November 1996 until 17 February 1997. Ebrahim was a retired Associate Judge of the Supreme Court of Pakistan, and Senior Advocate Supreme Court and was known also as a peace activist. In 1988, he was also Governor of Sindh, appointed by Prime Minister Benazir Bhutto during her first term.

In March 1981, serving as an ad hoc Judge of the Supreme Court of Pakistan, he refused to take a fresh oath, under the Provisional Constitutional Order (PCO) promulgated by General Zia-ul-Haq along with Justice Dorab Patel and Chief Justice Sheikh Anwarul Haq. The PCO not only negated the independence of the judiciary but also prolonged martial law by nullifying the effect of a judgement giving General Zia's regime limited recognition.

Ebrahim established the Citizen Police Liaison Committee (CPLC) in 1989. The CPLC works in Karachi and assists citizens in registering the First Information Report if it is refused by police for some reason. Ebrahim headed the law firm of Fakhruddin G. Ebrahim & Company, a general legal practice originally established in Bombay (now Mumbai), India. The firm relocated to Karachi in 1951.

Ebrahim had long-standing ties with the Pakistan Cricket Board (PCB). In 1995, the PCB initiated an inquiry, under the chairmanship of Ebrahim, to look into allegations made by Australian players Shane Warne and Mark Waugh surrounding the First Test between Pakistan and Australia in Karachi in 1994 and the ODI in Rawalpindi. The Australian cricketers had accused Saleem Malik of offering them bribes which they rejected. The inquiry was frustrated as the Australian players did not travel to Pakistan to give evidence, and thus the Inquiry had to rely on their statements together with the cross-examination of Saleem Malik. In October 1995, it was decided that the allegations were unfounded. In December 2006, Ebrahim also served as the Chairman of the PCB's Anti-doping Appeals Committee, which acquitted Shoaib Akhtar and Mohammad Asif. Ebrahim was in favour of the acquittal. He died On 7 January 2020 In Karachi, Pakistan.

References

1928 births
2020 deaths
Attorneys General of Pakistan
Governors of Sindh
Pakistani anti-war activists
Pakistani judges
Pakistani lawyers
Chief Election Commissioners of Pakistan
Recipients of Tamgha-e-Imtiaz
Lawyers from Karachi
Politicians from Karachi
Abbottabad Commission
Pakistani people of Gujarati descent
Sindh Muslim Law College alumni
People from Lahore